Dewey is the first cloned deer and was born on May 23, 2003. Specifically, he is a White-tailed Deer, or Odocoileus virginianus, and was cloned from a dead buck by the Texas A&M University College of Veterinary Medicine. At last report, Dewey was living a peaceful, uneventful life in College Station, TX.

Dewey was born on May 23, 2003. A DNA analysis proved that he was genetically identical to the donor, a buck that scored a 232 on the Boone and Crockett scale.  He was cloned from tissue harvested from the skin cells of the hunted deer. Researchers at Texas A&M are studying his antler growth as well as following his offspring to measure their antler growth.

References 

2003 animal births
Cloned animals
Individual deer
Individual animals in the United States
White-tailed deer